Charles Garrett Ponsonby Moore, 11th Earl of Drogheda KG, KBE (23 April 1910 – 24 December 1989), styled Viscount Moore until 1957, was a British peer.

Early life 
Lord Drogheda was the eldest son of The 10th Earl of Drogheda and his first wife, Kathleen Pelham Burn, and was educated at Ludgrove and Eton. In 1940, he became a captain in the Territorial Army division of the Royal Artillery. In 1946, he was appointed an Officer of the Order of the British Empire (OBE).

Career 
In 1946, he became Managing Director of The Financial Times and inherited his father's earldom in 1957. In 1964, he was promoted as a Knight Commander of the Order of the British Empire (KBE) and on his retirement in 1972, was appointed a Knight of the Garter (KG). From 1974, he was President of the Institute of Directors and from 1983, was Independent National Director of Times Newspapers, holding both posts up until his death.

Personal life and death 
On 16 May 1935, at City Hall in New York City, Drogheda, then Viscount Moore, married Joan Eleanor Carr (1902–1989, née Joan Eleanor M. Birkbeck), a former wife of Dawson R. Miller and a former wife of violinist Isek D. Melsak (known professionally as Daniel Melsa). A concert pianist, she was the only child of Lilian Henrietta Birkbeck (née White, formerly Mrs. James Braidwood Birkbeck) and William Henry Carr, aka William Henry Carr-Birkbeck, who were unmarried. A newspaper report noted that on the marriage application, Lord Moore's fiancée stated that her two prior marriages had ended in 1929 and 1930, that she was employed as an "artiste", and that "she could not remember the name of her father."

The Droghedas had one child, Henry "Derry" Dermot Ponsonby (born 1937), a photographer, who inherited the earldom upon his father's death. Lord Drogheda died on 24 December 1989, aged 79.

Sources
Burke's Peerage

References

External links

  Charles Moore with his mother, 1915

1910 births
1989 deaths
British Army personnel of World War II
Knights Commander of the Order of the British Empire
Knights of the Garter
People educated at Eton College
Royal Artillery officers
Earls of Drogheda
People educated at Ludgrove School